Larry Levine (May 10, 1926 – February 9, 2008) was an American designer of coats and suits.

He was born in Bensonhurst, Brooklyn to Polish, Jewish, immigrants. He served in the US Navy in World War II and eventually got a job as a road salesman for Capri Coat in the nineteen forties. In 1951 Levine founded Larry Levine, Inc. By the mid-sixties his traditional, classic, coats and suits were sold in virtually every clothing store in the country. Larry Levine was one of a very few clothing manufacturers of his time to brand his own name. In the early seventies Larry Levine hired London based designer Gerald McCann to come to New York and design exclusively for him. Their successful partnership lasted through the nineties. Levine created two labels for McCann: Gerald McCann and Emily Lawrence, LTD.

Levine's daughters Anne Levine and Elena Levine, both worked with their father in design, styling and sales. Elena went on to design for Anne Klein's coat division. Anne had an eponymous line manufactured by MDP, Inc. in the 1990s. Levine's wife Emily ran a group of retail stores called Emily Lawrence.

Levine sold part of his company to S. Rothschild, Inc. in 1991 but remained as president. In 1996 Levine cut all ties with the S. Rothschild. "Larry Levine Inc.was the strongest label in women's outerwear in the United States from the sixties through the eighties" says Stan Rutstein, President of Casual Corner. Larry Levine coats and suits are an integral part of Federated Stores' matrix with garments sold in Macy's, Lord & Taylor, Nordstrom's etc.

References

Sarasota Herald-Tribune  February 12, 2008
The Today Show NBC  October 23, 2014
Article from: Women's Wear Daily | January 14, 1991 | Friedman, Arthur |
Article from: Women's Wear Daily | February 5, 1991 |
Article from: Women's Wear Daily | May 16, 1995|

External links
Paid Notice: Deaths LEVINE, LARRY. New York Times, February 11, 2008
Gerald McCann (fashion designer)

American fashion designers
1926 births
1990 deaths